Extreme Justice is a 1993 American action thriller film directed by Mark L. Lester and starring Lou Diamond Phillips, Scott Glenn, and Chelsea Field. Originally intended to be released theatrically in April 1993, Trimark Pictures cancelled its release due to the 1992 Los Angeles riots and shifted the film to air on HBO on June 26, 1993; the film was first theatrically released in the Philippines on May 5, 1993.

Plot

After an incident where he used questionable police tactics, Jeff Powers (Lou Diamond Phillips) is placed on probation. Upon hearing of his probation, a friend from the force later invites Jeff to join the Special Investigation Section, an elite and highly secretive Los Angeles Police Department(LAPD) unit designed to track and shut down high-profile criminals. Jeff discovers that the group is actually a group of rogue cops who actually function like an unofficially sanctioned death squad, and are given wide latitude in dealing with criminals. Although their official mission is to survey criminals and arrest them in the act of committing a crime, the squad often resorts to brutality and murder to dispatch the subjects they are supposed to arrest.

Jeff questions the purpose of the squad and begins to see them as more of a harm to society than a positive force for justice. When he tries to bring evidence of the squad's abuse of power, he learns that the squad is protected by well-connected and very influential people who already know and condone the squad's methods. Jeff's former teammates in the squad begin to suspect that Jeff has turned on them and decide to take measures to eliminate him before he can expose their activities to the public.

Cast
Lou Diamond Phillips as Detective Jeff Powers
Scott Glenn as Detective Dan Vaughn
Chelsea Field as Kelly Daniels
Yaphet Kotto as Detective Larson
Andrew Divoff as Angel
Richard Grove as Lloyd
William Lucking as Cusak
L. Scott Caldwell as Devlin
Larry Holt as Reese
Daniel Quinn as Bobby Lewis, The Surfer
Thomas Rosales Jr. as Chavez (as Tom Rosales)
Ed Frias as Herrera
Jay Arlen Jones as Nash
Adam Gifford as Speer
Jophery C. Brown as Vince
Stephen Root as Max Alvarez
Sonia Lopes as Rosa Rodrigues
Ed Lauter as Captain Shafer

See also
Magnum Force - the second film in the Dirty Harry series

References

External links

1993 films
1993 action thriller films
American action thriller films
American police detective films
Films directed by Mark L. Lester
Films scored by David Michael Frank
Films set in Los Angeles
1990s English-language films
1990s American films